Casimir Pereira (born 4 March 1954) is a Seychellois sprinter. He competed in the men's 200 metres at the 1980 Summer Olympics.

References

1954 births
Living people
Athletes (track and field) at the 1980 Summer Olympics
Seychellois male sprinters
Olympic athletes of Seychelles
Place of birth missing (living people)